NDK Metro Station (‘National Palace of Culture’) is a station on the Sofia Metro in Bulgaria. It opened on 31 August 2012. Bulgaria's PM Boyko Borisov and the President of the European Commission Jose Manuel Barroso inaugurated the new section of the Sofia Metro, which was funded with EU money.  On 26 August 2020, transfer to NDK II on M3 line was opened.

Interchange with other public transport

North side:
 Trolleybus service: 1, 2, 5, 8, 9

South side:
 Tramway service: 1, 6, 7
 Trolleybus service: 1, 2, 5, 8, 9

Location
The station is serving the National Palace of Culture and the south end of Vitosha Boulevard.

Gallery

References

External links

 Sofia Metropolitan (Official site)
 More info in Bulgarian
 SofiaMetro@UrbanRail
 Sofia Urban Mobility Center
 Sofia Metro station projects
 360 degree panorama from outside the station (south end)
 Sofia Metropolitan
 Project Slide

Sofia Metro stations
Railway stations opened in 2012
2012 establishments in Bulgaria